Brooks–Brown House, also known as the Brown-Law House, Law Home, and Halfway House, is a historic home located near Dickinson, Franklin County, Virginia.  The first section was built about 1830, with a two-story addition built about 1850. Renovations about 1870, unified the two sections as a two-story, frame dwelling with a slate gable roof.  At the same time, an Italianate style two-story porch was added and the interior was remodeled in the Greek Revival style. A rear kitchen and bathroom wing was added as part of a renovation in 1987–1988. It measures approximately 52 feet by 38 feet and sits on a brick foundation.  Also on the property are a contributing detached log kitchen and dining room, a cemetery, and the site of a 19th-century barn.  The house served as a stagecoach stop and inn during the mid-19th century and the property had a tobacco factory from about 1870 until 1885.

It was listed on the National Register of Historic Places in 1989.

References

Houses on the National Register of Historic Places in Virginia
Houses completed in 1870
Greek Revival houses in Virginia
Italianate architecture in Virginia
Houses in Franklin County, Virginia
National Register of Historic Places in Franklin County, Virginia